Gülermak Ağır Sanayi İnşaat ve Taahhüt A Ş. (Gülermak in short form) is a Turkish construction company, especially for rail transport,  established in 1958.

Overview
Gülermak has been involved in constructing more than 260 km of underground tunnels and 120 metro stations. According to Engineering News-Record (ENR), in 2020 the company was the 124th international contractor in the world with revenues of $699.1 million. The company has offices in Ankara (Turkey), and Warsaw (Poland), Dubai (United Arab Emirates), Stockholm (Sweden) and  Mumbai (India).

Gülermak undertakes construction projects internationally, especially for rail transport, for example in India, Norway, Poland, Turkey, United Arab Emirates, etc. Gülermak has been contributed to construction projects such as the following:

 Expressway S2 (Poland)
 Golden Horn Metro Bridge
 Istanbul Metro
 M4 (Istanbul Metro)
 Pune Metro
 Route 2020 (Dubai Metro)
 Kanpur Metro

Gülermak is part of the ExpoLink Consortium, established in 2016, comprising Alstom, Acciona, and Gülermak, that is constructing the Route 2020 metro line, part of the Dubai Metro, linking Expo 2020 to the Red Line. In 2020, Gülermak was awarded a Kraków tram line contract in Poland.  Examples of projects include metro stations and infrastructure in India, a metro line branch in Dubai, the underground in Warsaw. Gülermak has its own assembly lines.

The company's projects, especially tunnelling using tunnel boring machines (TBMs), have been discussed in peer-reviewed papers. Record-breaking results involving the company have been reported on the Dudullu-Bostancı Metro Line in Istanbul.

Controversy
In 2017, it was reported that the company experienced delays in the software for the signalling system of the Ankara-Konya High-Speed Train. In early 2021, there were reported issues with salary payments for the company's workers during the construction of the Sabiha Gökçen Airport metro.

See also

 List of companies of Turkey

References

External links
 Gülermak website

1958 establishments in Turkey
Construction and civil engineering companies established in 1958
Manufacturing companies based in Ankara
Transport companies of Turkey
Construction and civil engineering companies of Turkey
Railway infrastructure companies
Rail infrastructure manufacturers
Rail vehicle manufacturers of Turkey